The Extra Flugzeugbau EA300 is a two-seat aerobatic monoplane capable of Unlimited category competition. It was designed in 1987 by Walter Extra, a German aerobatic pilot, and built by Extra Flugzeugbau.

Design and development
Design of the Extra 300 was based on the Extra 230, an early 1980s monoplane having a wing made of wood. The Extra 300 has a welded steel tube fuselage covered in aluminium and fabric. The midset wing has a carbon fiber composite spar and carbon composite skins. A symmetrical airfoil, mounted with a zero angle of incidence, provides equal performance in both upright and inverted flight. The landing gear is fixed taildragger style with composite main legs and fiberglass wheel pants. The powerplant is a fuel-injected Lycoming AEIO-540 which produces 300 horsepower (224 kW).

The first two-seat Extra 300 made its maiden flight on 6 May 1988, with German type certification following on 16 May 1990. The single-seat Extra 300S flew on 4 March 1992.

The Extra 300 is stressed for ±10 G with one person on board and ±8 G with two. Some Extra 300s are registered in the experimental category under a Special Certificate of Airworthiness in the U.S., while others are type certified in the aerobatic category.

Variants
300
Original two-seat version
300S
330SX
The Extra 330SX was a custom development of the 300S with a wider-chord rudder, a larger elevator, and a more powerful Lycoming AEIO-580 powerplant producing . Some 300Ss were sold with the "bigger tail" of the 330SX. The 330SX was later replaced by the 330SC.
300SP
The 300SP is a performance version of the 300S single-seater. Weight was reduced, and the tail of the 330SX installed. It is discontinued, being replaced by the 330SC.
300SHP
The 300SHP (HP = high performance) is an uncertified version of the 300SP with a Lycoming AEIO-580 engine.
300SR
The Extra 300SR is a modified aircraft using a specially designed high-lift wing for the Red Bull Air Race World Series.

The Extra 300L is a Lycoming AEIO-540-powered two-seat aircraft, with low-mounted wing and shorter fuselage. More of these two-seater variants have been produced than any other model. Improved ailerons boost the 300L's roll rate to 400° per second. All 300Ls are fully certified under FAA and European Joint Aviation Authorities regulations.
300LP
The 300LP (P = performance) is a reduced-weight version of the 300L, redesigned for better performance in competitions and airshows.
330SC
The Extra 330SC is a Lycoming AEIO-580-powered single-seat aircraft with improved roll rate and easier roll stops, designed specifically for Unlimited category competition. It is the only single-seater aerobatic aircraft currently being built by Extra.
330LX
The Extra 330LX is a Lycoming AEIO-580-powered two-seat aircraft.
330LT
The Extra 330LT is a Lycoming AEIO-580 powered two-seat aircraft, adapted for touring. It has an EFIS cockpit and a reduced roll rate in comparison with the 330LX.
330LE
The Extra 330LE is a one-seat aircraft powered by an electric engine made by Siemens, delivering 260 kW, for 50 kg. On Thursday, March 23, 2017, the Extra 330LE set two new speed records, said Siemens : "At the Dinslaken Schwarze Heide airfield in Germany, the electric aircraft reached a top speed of around 340 kilometers per hour (km/h) over a distance of three kilometers. On Friday, March 24, 2017, the Extra 330LE gave another premiere performance by becoming the world's first electric aircraft to tow a glider into the sky".

Operators

Civilian
 Aviation Performance Solutions is the largest user of Extra 300Ls, with a fleet of eight aircraft used for upset prevention and recovery training (UPRT) in the United States at its bases in Mesa, Arizona and Arlington, Texas.
 The Blades private aerobatic team displays at air shows in Britain using a team of four Extra 300LPs. It offers passenger flights to members of the public and aerobatic training for pilots.
 Patty Wagstaff has flown the Extra 230, 260, and various models of the 300 in aerobatic competitions and airshows since the mid-1980s.
  operates eight Extra 300 aircraft, of which three are SC versions and five are L versions. They are mainly used for aerobatic flights under the Hawks of Romania team name at various public events.

Military operators

 Chilean Air Force - The Escuadrilla de Alta Acrobacia Halcones ("Chilean Air force High Aerobatics Squadron, called "Hawks") has used the 300L variant since 2003.

French Air and Space Force

Royal Jordanian Air Force
The Royal Jordanian Falcons, the aerobatic demonstration team of Royal Jordanian Airlines and the official national aerobatic team of Jordan, perform in a formation of four Extra 300s.

The Kris Sakti, the Royal Malaysian Air Force aerobatic demonstration team

Specifications (EA-330LT)

See also

References
Notes

Bibliography
Lambert, Mark. Jane's All The World's Aircraft 1993–94. Coulsdon, UK:Jane's Data Division, 1993. .
Taylor, Michael. Brassey's World Aircraft & Systems Directory 1999/2000. London:Brassey's, 1999. 1 85753 245 7.

External links

 EA-300LP company page
 Walkaround Extra 330LC from Borki airfield, Russia

EA-300
1980s German sport aircraft
Aerobatic aircraft
Mid-wing aircraft
Single-engined tractor aircraft
Aircraft first flown in 1988
Conventional landing gear